Cegielinka is a river of Poland, an anabranch of the East Oder near Zdroje, Szczecin.

References 

0Cegielinka
Rivers of Poland
Rivers of West Pomeranian Voivodeship